William S. Hyndman (October 1, 1854 – January 14, 1920) was an American baseball player who played for the 1886 Philadelphia Athletics.

External links

1854 births
1920 deaths
19th-century baseball players
Major League Baseball outfielders
Philadelphia Athletics (AA) players
Wilkes-Barre (minor league baseball) players
Baseball players from Philadelphia